The 1976 Men's African Volleyball Championship was in Tunis, Tunisia, with 7 teams participating in the continental championship.

Teams

Results

Final ranking

References
 Men Volleyball Africa Championship 1976 Tunis (TUN)

1976 Men
African championship, Men
Men's African Volleyball Championship
1976 in Tunisian sport
International volleyball competitions hosted by Tunisia